Dave Grant (22 January 1959 – 24 January 2010) was an Australian stand-up comedian.

Early life and education
David Christopher James Grant was born in Govan (Glasgow), Scotland to John (Doug) and Esther Grant.  When he was three years old, the Grant family, including his older sisters Pamela and Barbara and younger sister Elaine, immigrated to Melbourne, Australia, his father's home town. They settled in Mornington initially then nearby Doveton where three more children - Albert, Roxanne and Karen - were born.

Career
Grant began his comedy career writing for local comedians. In November 1990, he performed his first stand-up routine in a bar in North Melbourne that attracted shift workers from the neighbouring wharfs. Grant toured Australia performing his comedy and also performed an open mic in New York. Grant was father to a daughter, Marieke.

Whilst working as a comic host of Hen's Night bus tours Grant met Karen Livingstone. Grant and Livingstone became partners a few months later, living in her family home in Carlton, Victoria. The pair had two children; Madeleine and Spencer.

Grant performed in comedy clubs and on talk shows for twenty years. He joined an Australia comedy showcase tour to Los Angeles in 1999.  In 2006 he created a comedy routine for the Royal Automobile Club of Victoria to encourage young drivers not to drive while sleep-deprived.

Grant's comedy often revolved around men's health and men's behaviour. He performed twelve one man comedy shows at the Melbourne International Comedy Festival. He also acted in the 2008 short film, The Un-Australian.

Grant often mentored younger comics. He also monitored the seating, the lights, the support performers and the MC at his comedy shows. Grant closed each routine with 'Look after each other brothers and sisters, that's what its all about!'

Death and legacy
Grant was diagnosed with pancreatic cancer in 2009.  'Doin it for Dave' benefit gigs, supported by many comedians and comedy promoters were held various cities in Australia to raise funds to support Grant and his family. Despite alternative treatment in Tijuana and conventional treatment in Australia, Grant's health deteriorated.  He died on 24 January 2010.

A compilation of Grant's comedy was made after his death, entitled Is it just me?. A grant is presented in his name to emerging comedians who are participating in their first Adelaide fringe comedy show.

References

2010 deaths
1958 births
Australian stand-up comedians